Natalie Wynn (born October 21, 1988) is an American YouTuber, political commentator, and cultural critic. She is best known for her YouTube channel, ContraPoints, where she creates video essays exploring a wide range of topics such as politics, gender, ethics, race, and philosophy.

Her videos often provide counterargument to right-wing extremists and classical liberals and talk about modern social issues such as class inequality, LGBTQ rights (particularly trans rights), cancel culture, and modern internet culture. Her videos have received widespread media coverage for their intricately designed sets and costumes and for their darkly humorous tone, which has led The Verge to call her "the Oscar Wilde of YouTube". In recognition of her videos, Wynn won a Streamy Award for "Commentary" in 2020, and was nominated in the same category at the 2021 Streamy Awards.

Early life 
Wynn was born on October 21, 1988, in Arlington, Virginia, and raised in the same state. Her father is a psychology professor and her mother is a doctor. After studying piano at Berklee College of Music, she attended Georgetown University and studied philosophy, then enrolled at Northwestern University to pursue a PhD in philosophy, also serving as an instructor. She left Northwestern with a master's degree, saying, "The idea of being an academic for the rest of my life became boring to the point of existential despair," and moved to Baltimore, Maryland for a relationship, which ended up failing. After quitting her PhD program, Wynn taught piano, and worked as a paralegal, Uber driver, copywriter, and would-be novelist, eventually deciding to begin making video responses to the alt-right and Gamergate on YouTube.

YouTube career 
Wynn started publishing YouTube videos in 2008, initially focusing on criticism of religion and her position as an atheist and skeptic. In 2016, she began the ContraPoints channel in reaction to the Gamergate controversy and the increasing prevalence of right-wing YouTubers, shifting her content to countering their arguments. Early ContraPoints videos also covered subjects such as race, racism, and online radicalization.

Artistry 

In her videos, Wynn utilizes philosophy and personal anecdotes to not only explain left-wing ideas, but to also criticize common conservative, classical liberal, alt-right, and fascist talking points. Wynn's videos often have a combative but humorous tone, containing dark and surreal humor, sarcasm, and sexual themes. She often illustrates concepts by playing different characters who debate one another. The videos have been noted for her production choices such as dramatic lighting, elaborate costumes, and vibrant aesthetics. She borrows some aesthetic cues from drag performance, joking in a 2019 interview that if conservatives were going to call her a drag queen anyway, she might as well "be the most extravagant drag queen on YouTube." In a 2018 interview for The Verge, Katherine Cross notes a significant difference between Wynn in-person and how she presents on YouTube, explaining that the YouTube channel portrays an image of being "blithe, aloof, decadent and disdainful", whereas personally Wynn "can be earnest—and she cares deeply, almost too much."

The video channel is financed through the crowdfunding platform Patreon, where Wynn has been among the top 20 creators on the site. As of March 2023, Wynn has about 12,700 Patreon supporters.

Reception 
Wynn's videos have been praised for their clarity, nuance, and attention-grabbing sense of humor. Jake Hall, writing for Vice, called Wynn "one of the most incisive and compelling video essayists on YouTube". In an article contrasting her personal sincerity and her ironic sense of humor, The Verge describes her as the "Oscar Wilde of YouTube." New York magazine states, "ContraPoints is very good. Regardless of the viewer's interest or lack thereof in internet culture wars, YouTube Nazis, or any of the other wide-ranging subjects covered in its videos, they're funny, bizarre, erudite, and compelling." Nathan J. Robinson of Current Affairs calls ContraPoints a "one-woman blitzkrieg against the YouTube right," describing her videos as "unlike anything I've ever seen ... She shows how debate should be done: not by giving an inch to poisonous ideas, but by bringing superior smarts, funnier jokes, and more elegant costumes to the fight."

Media often describe the channel's content as uniquely suited to a millennial audience, due to its humorous style and its direct attention to online culture. Her analysis of fascists' use of memes and coded symbols has been cited by the Southern Poverty Law Center in an article explaining the right-wing use of the OK sign. Journalist Liza Featherstone recommends the channel as well, saying that she does a "fabulous job" acknowledging her opponents' valid points while debunking weak arguments and revealing the influence of a sometimes unacknowledged far-right political agenda.

In November 2018, after a ContraPoints video about incels reached over one million views, The New Yorker released a profile of the channel, describing Wynn as "one of the few Internet demi-celebrities who is as clever as she thinks she is, and one of the few leftists anywhere who can be nuanced without being boring." The Atlantic praised Wynn's use of "lush sets, moody lighting, and original music by the composer Zoë Blade" and opined of her videos that "The most spectacular attraction [...] is Wynn herself." Polygon named her video on incels one of the 10 best video essays of the year 2018. In May 2019, she topped the Dazed 100 list, which ranks people who "dared to give culture a shot in the arm."

The ContraPoints YouTube channel won Best Commentary at the 10th Annual Streamy Awards.

Pronouns controversy 
In September 2019, Wynn described on Twitter feelings of awkwardness when asked in some contexts to describe her preferred gender pronouns. The tweets were criticized as dismissive of non-binary people who use pronouns other than "he/him" and "she/her". Linguistics professor Lal Zimman said about pronoun introductions, "Wynn is absolutely right that people engage with that practice in ways that can be somewhat problematic". Following constant negative harassment, Wynn deactivated her Twitter account for a week, then posted an apology. Shortly after, Wynn's video "Opulence" featured a quote from John Waters read by transsexual pornographic actor Buck Angel, whose views on transgender and non-binary people have attracted criticism, including by some who see Angel's views as being transmedicalist. She was criticized for featuring Angel, including by journalist Ana Valens. Wynn, as well as other YouTubers associated with her channel, were widely harassed.

Wynn's January 2020 video "Canceling" addressed both criticism and harassment of her, and the broader context of cancel culture. It was praised by Robby Soave of Reason. In a Guardian interview on her January 2021 video "J.K. Rowling", in which she addressed cancel culture again in the context of trans-exclusionary radical feminists, she expressed that she is generally not interested in canceling anyone, and said that valid criticism needs to be handed out constructively so as to educate people.

Personal life 
Wynn is a transgender woman, a matter prominently featured in her videos; she began her gender transition in 2017. She previously identified as genderqueer. She is a feminist and has called herself a democratic socialist and social democrat. She endorsed Bernie Sanders in the 2020 Democratic presidential primaries and supports Alexandria Ocasio-Cortez. , she resides in Baltimore, Maryland. In 2020, she came out as a lesbian in her video "Shame".

Awards

|-
| 2020
| Streamy Awards
| Best Commentary
| ContraPoints
| 
| 
|-
| 2021
| Streamy Awards
| Best Commentary
| ContraPoints
| 
| 
|}

Videos

The following list of ContraPoints's videos includes only the ones which are still accessible on the ContraPoints YouTube channel. In February 2020, Wynn set all her videos from before August 2017—when she began her gender transition—to private, stating that they "no longer represent the person I've become". She posted transcripts of the majority of these older videos on her website.

See also 
 BreadTube
 Hbomberguy
 Innuendo Studios
 Abigail Thorn
 Lindsay Ellis

References

Further reading

External links 

 
 YouTube channel
 YouTube channel for livestreams

1988 births
American YouTubers
American anti-fascists
American atheists
American infotainers
American democratic socialists
American social democrats
Berklee College of Music alumni
English-language YouTube channels
Georgetown University alumni
LGBT feminists
LGBT people from Maryland
LGBT people from Virginia
Lesbian entertainers
Lesbian feminists
Living people
Maryland socialists
Northwestern University alumni
Patreon creators
People from Arlington County, Virginia
People from Baltimore
Queer women
American socialist feminists
Transfeminists
LGBT media personalities
Transgender women
Video essayists
YouTube controversies
20th-century LGBT people
21st-century American LGBT people
LGBT YouTubers
YouTubers who make LGBT-related content